Leopold Zingerle (born 10 April 1994) is a German professional footballer who plays as a goalkeeper for 2. Bundesliga club SC Paderborn 07.

Playing career 

Zingerle was born and raised in Munich. He spent his entire career as a youth footballer with Bayern Munich, making it all the way to becoming the first-choice goalkeeper for the club's reserve team and frequently training with the first team during that time. As the fourth-choice goalkeeper in the first team during the 2013–14 season, he was named on the bench for a Bundesliga match at Augsburg in April 2014, due to injuries to Tom Starke and Lukas Raeder. However, he did not manage to make an appearance for the first team in a competitive match and left Bayern Munich in the summer of 2015, after spending 13 years at the club.

Zingerle went on to join Greuther Fürth of the 2. Bundesliga, but only managed to make 12 appearances for their reserves in the fourth tier of German football. He left the club for 1. FC Magdeburg of the 3. Liga ahead of the 2016–17 season, during which he appeared in a total of 21 league matches.

In the summer of 2017, Zingerle moved to SC Paderborn 07, who also competed in the 3. Liga at the time, and went on to be the club's first-choice goalkeeper over the next four seasons. During his first two seasons with SC Paderborn 07, the club got promoted twice, which allowed him to make his debut in the Bundesliga and appear in a total of 28 matches in the top flight in 2019–20. Following the club's relegation back to the 2. Bundesliga at the end of that season, Zingerle kept his place as a regular and signed a two-year contract extension in February 2021.

References

Living people
1994 births
Footballers from Munich
German footballers
Association football goalkeepers
FC Bayern Munich II players
SpVgg Greuther Fürth players
1. FC Magdeburg players
SC Paderborn 07 players
3. Liga players
2. Bundesliga players